Theodore R. Hostetter (October 19, 1870 – August 3, 1902) was an American heir, businessman, polo player and yachtsman during the Gilded Age.

Early life
Theodore Rickey Hostetter was born in 1870. His father was David Hostetter (1819-1888) and his mother, Rosetta (Rickey) Hostetter. He had a brother, D. Herbert Hostetter. He attended public schools in Allegheny County, Pennsylvania the Western University of Pennsylvania, and a college in New England.

Career
He served as Vice President of the Hostetter Company, his family business. He also ran the East End Riding Academy.

He built a polo field on his Pennsylvania farm, and played polo regularly.

He was also a notable gambler. For example, he won US$30,000 on the United States presidential election of 1896, by betting on William McKinley. He also gambled and won on yacht races. Additionally, he would bet US$1,000 a game on polo matches in Narragansett Pier. The year before his death, he lost US$1 million, mostly to David C. Johnson, John Daly and Richard Canfield. David C. Johnson sued his widow to get his money back.

Personal life
In 1891, Hostetter was married to Allene Tew (1872–1955). They had a farm in Beaver County, Pennsylvania. They also resided at the Waldorf Astoria New York, a luxury hotel in Manhattan, New York City. Additionally, they summered in Narragansett Pier, Rhode Island and wintered in South Carolina. They had three children:

 Greta Hostetter (1892-1918), who married Glenn Stewart.
 Verna Hostetter (1893-1895), who died in early childhood.
 Theodore R. Hostetter Jr. (1897-1918), who was killed in World War I.

Additionally, he was an avid yachtsman. He was a member of the New York Yacht Club and the Columbia Boat Club.

He died of pneumonia on August 3, 1902. After his death, his widow remarried four times, including to Anson Wood Burchard, Prince Heinrich XXXIII Reuss of Köstritz, and Count Pavel de Kotzebue.

References

External links

1870 births
1902 deaths
Deaths from pneumonia in New York City
People from Beaver County, Pennsylvania
People from Narragansett, Rhode Island
People from Manhattan
University of Pittsburgh alumni
American polo players
Members of the New York Yacht Club
American gamblers
Burials at Allegheny Cemetery
19th-century American businesspeople